Robert Frank Godec (born 1956) is an American diplomat who has served as the United States Ambassador to Thailand since October 2022. He formerly served as the United States ambassador to Kenya from 2013 to 2019 and the United States ambassador to Tunisia from 2006 to 2009. He also served as acting assistant secretary for the Bureau of African Affairs from January to September 2021.

Early life and education 
Godec was born in Rantoul, Illinois, in 1956. He earned a Bachelor of Arts in foreign affairs from the University of Virginia in 1979 and a Master of Arts in international relations from Yale University.

Career
Godec is a career member of the Senior Foreign Service with the rank of career minister; He has served in the service since 1985. He serves as senior coordinator for Afghanistan in the Bureau of Population, Refugees, and Migration at the U.S. Department of State. Previously, he was acting assistant secretary of state for the Bureau of African Affairs. He also served as principal deputy assistant secretary and as deputy assistant secretary in the Bureau of African Affairs. Earlier, Godec was deputy commandant and international affairs advisor at the National War College. Godec also served as principal deputy coordinator for counterterrorism in the Bureau of Counterterrorism in the Department of State. Godec has also served as deputy assistant secretary of state in the Bureau of Near Eastern Affairs and was deputy coordinator for the transition in Iraq. He served as acting deputy chief of mission and minister counselor for Economic Affairs in the U.S. embassy in Pretoria, South Africa. His other positions include economic counselor at U.S. embassy in Nairobi, Kenya; assistant office director for Thailand and Burma in the Bureau of East Asian and Pacific Affairs; and director for southeast asian affairs at the Office of the U.S. Trade Representative.

United States ambassador to Tunisia 
Godec had previously served as United States ambassador to Tunisia. In December 2010 a number of classified diplomatic cables written by Godec from Tunisia in 2008 and 2009 were released by WikiLeaks and published by Al Akhbar in Beirut. Many of them were highly critical of the public and personal life of the Tunisian president, Zine el Abidine Ben Ali, and his family. Godec mentioned high-level corruption, a "sclerotic" regime, and deep dislike or even hatred for the president's wife, Leila Trabelsi, and her family. There were later suggestions in the press that his comments could have fuelled the Tunisian Revolution, which began in December 2010 and led to the flight of Ben Ali to Saudi Arabia in January 2011.

United States ambassador to Kenya 
Godec was United States ambassador to Kenya from 2013 to 2019. He was also Chargé d’Affaires a.i. at U.S. Embassy Nairobi, Kenya in 2012.

United States ambassador to Thailand 
On April 1, 2022, President Joe Biden nominated Godec to be the United States ambassador to Thailand. Hearings on his nomination were held before the Senate Foreign Relations Committee on July 13, 2022. the committee favorably reported his nomination to the Senate floor on August 3, 2022. He was confirmed by the Senate via voice vote on August 4, 2022. Godec presented his credentials to King Vajiralongkorn on October 7, 2022.

Awards and recognitions
Godec has won two Presidential Meritorious Service Awards, numerous Senior Performance Awards, and a Distinguished Honor Award.

Personal life 
Since 1986, Godec has been married to Lori G. Magnusson. He speaks French and German.

References

External links

1956 births
Living people
21st-century American diplomats
Ambassadors of the United States to Kenya
Ambassadors of the United States to Thailand
Ambassadors of the United States to Tunisia
People from Rantoul, Illinois
United States Foreign Service personnel
University of Virginia alumni
Yale University alumni